Bury is a town in the Metropolitan Borough of Bury, Greater Manchester, England, and it is unparished.  The central area of the town and the surrounding countryside contain 67 listed buildings that are recorded in the National Heritage List for England.  Of these, one is listed at Grade I, the highest of the three grades, three are at Grade II*, the middle grade, and the others are at Grade II, the lowest grade.

Since the Industrial Revolution Bury has been mainly an industrial and commercial town, its major industry in the past being cotton, with diversification of industries since.  The listed buildings include farmhouses in the surrounding countryside, private houses and associated structures in and around the central area, churches, public houses, banks and other commercial buildings, civic buildings, structures associated with the East Lancashire Railway, an armoury, two drinking fountains, a statue of Sir Robert Peel, a bridge, monuments, and three war memorials.


Key

Buildings

References

Citations

Sources

Lists of listed buildings in Greater Manchester
Listed